The 2016 Alcorn State Braves football team represented Alcorn State University in the 2016 NCAA Division I FCS football season. The Braves were led by first-year head coach Fred McNair and played their home games at Casem-Spinks Stadium. They were a member of the East Division of the Southwestern Athletic Conference and finished with a record of 5–6 as SWAC runners-up after they were defeated by Grambling State in the SWAC Championship Game.

Schedule

References

Alcorn State
Alcorn State Braves football seasons
Alcorn State Braves football